Melegnano railway station is a railway station in Italy. Located on the Milan–Bologna railway, it serves the town of Melegnano.

Services
Melegnano is served by lines S1 and S12 of the Milan suburban railway service, operated by the Lombard railway company Trenord.

See also
 Milan suburban railway service

References

External links

Railway stations in Lombardy
Milan S Lines stations
Railway stations opened in 1861
1861 establishments in Italy
Melegnano
Railway stations in Italy opened in the 19th century